The Redwall Cookbook is a cookbook based on food from the Redwall series.  It contains recipes mentioned in the books, from Deeper'n'Ever Pie and Summer Strawberry Fizz to Abbey Trifle and Great Hall Gooseberry Fool.

Summary
This book features numerous recipes for dishes mentioned in the Redwall series, and features illustrations by Christopher Denise.  The plot follows Sister Pansy through one cycle of the seasons in Redwall Abbey, as she becomes the Head Cook.

The cookbook is divided into the four seasons:  Spring, Summer, Autumn and Winter.  As befits the cooking of gentle woodland creatures, all of the recipes (with the exception of the obvious crustacean ingredient in Shrimp'n'Hotroot Soup) are completely vegetarian. Each recipe is preceded by a description of who is making the dish and how it is being prepared. There are also short warnings and anecdotes by the characters sprinkled throughout the text.

Recipes

Spring Recipes
Hare's Pawspring Vegetable Soup
Crispy Cheese'n'Onion Hogbake
Vegetable Casserole à La Foremole
Gourmet Garrison Grilled Leeks
Stuffed Springtide Mushrooms
Abbot's Special Abbey Trifle
Spiced Gatehouse Tea Bread
Honeybaked Apples
Hot Mint Tea

Summer Recipes
Hotroot Sunsalad
Brockhall Badger Carrot Cakes
Great Hall Gooseberry Fool
Cheerful Churchmouse Cherry Crisp
Rosey's Jolly Raspberry Jelly Rock Cakes
Afternoon Tea Scones with Strawberry Jam and Cream
Squirrelmum's Blackberry and Apple Cake
Guosim Shrew Shortbread
Summer Strawberry Fizz
Summer Salad

Autumn Recipes
Mole's Favourite Deeper'n'Ever Turnip'n'Tater'n'Beetroot Pie
Bellringer's Reward (Roast Roots and Baked Spuds)
October Ale
Autumn Oat Favourites
Hare's Haversack Crumble
Harvestberry Sunset Pudden
Loamhedge Legacy Nut bread
Dibbun's Delight
Golden Hill Pears

Winter Recipes
Shrimp'n'Hotroot Soup
Veggible Molebake
Savoury Squirrel Bakes
Outside'n'Inside Cobbler Riddle
Stones Inna Swamp 
Rubbadeedubb Pudding
Nunnymolers
Applesnow
Mossflower Mulled Cider

References 

2005 non-fiction books
Redwall books
Cookbooks